James Mather may refer to:
 James Mather (politician) (c. 1750–1821), mayor of New Orleans
 James Mather (sound editor), British sound editor
 James Mather (1738–1796), co-founder of whaling company Mather & Co.

See also
 Jim Mather (born 1947), Scottish National Party politician
 James Mathers (disambiguation)